Panchaloha, also called Pañcadhātu, is a term for traditional five-metal alloys of sacred significance, used for making Hindu temple murti and jewelry.

Composition 
The composition is laid down in the Shilpa shastras, a collection of ancient texts that describe arts, crafts, and their design rules, principles and standards. Panchaloha is traditionally described as an alloy of Gold, Silver, Copper, Zinc, and Iron. It is believed that wearing jewellery made of such an alloy brings balance in life, self-confidence, good health, fortune, prosperity, and peace of mind.

In Tibetan culture, it was considered auspicious to use thokcha (meteoric iron) either as a component of the alloy in general or for a specific object or purpose.  The amount used could vary, depending upon the material's availability and suitability, among other considerations.  A small, largely symbolic quantity of "sky-iron" might be added, or it might be included as a significant part of the alloy-recipe.

See also

References

Further reading 
 The Lost-Wax Casting of Icons, Utensils, Bells, and Other Items in South India, R.M. Pillai, S.G.K. Pillai, and A.D. Damodaran, October 2002, JOM.

Copper alloys
Hindu iconography
Precious metal alloys
Zinc alloys
Iron compounds
Gold compounds
Silver compounds
Tin alloys
Lead alloys